Odus Creamer Horney (September 18, 1866 – February 16, 1957) was an officer of the U.S Army from 1891 to 1930. Horney transferred from infantry to ordnance in 1894. He co-designed the M1903 Springfield rifle and invented the smokeless powder plant factory. During World War I, Horney returned to serve as lieutenant colonel. In 1919, Horney was reappointed as lieutenant colonel and ordnance officer of the Philippine Department.

Early life
Odus Creamer Horny was born to James W. Horney and Josephine Creamer Horney on September 18, 1866. Horney graduated from the United States Military Academy as number six of sixty-five in the Class of 1891. His father, James W. Horney, was a volunteer of the Ohio Volunteer Infantry during the Civil War, in which he died of illness. Horney attended primary and secondary school at Mechanicsburg, Ohio and taught in order to support his family. In 1887, he attended United States Military Academy by alternative appointment and graduated six of his class.

Military career 
Horney was first stationed in infantry until 1894. He then transferred to ordnance, where he remained until 1930. In 1898, Horney co-designed the M1903 Springfield while stationed at the Springfield Armory. He also modified the sea cannons of the Watervliet Arsenal which improved the firing rate of all seacoast cannons. In 1905, he was assistant to the Chief of Ordnance in Washington, D.C. He built and oversaw the first U.S smokeless powder plant.  In 1911, Horney designed and constructed a water dam on Mississippi, in which the Western Society of Engineers examined. Horney resigned on July 14, 1915, to become the technical director of Aetna Explosives Co.

Horney volunteered for service on July 25, 1917 and was Commissioned Major of the Ordnance Reserve Corps. He was later assigned to the Chief of the Supply Division, the Office of the Assistant Secretary of War, and the Estimates and Requirements Division. As a brigadier general, Horney inspected ordnance following Armistice of 11 November 1918. In 1919, Horney was appointed to ordnance officer of the Philippine Department from 1927 to 1929.

Later life 

In 1930, Horney retired as brigadier general and lived in San Mateo, California. He died in San Francisco on February 16, 1957. Horney is buried at San Francisco National Cemetery.

Relations 

Odus Creamer Horney married Rezia Bryan on July 29, 1891. They had four children together: Ruth, Grace, Esther, and Odus C. Horney Jr.

References

External links 

Odus C. Horney, [West Point Assiocation of Graduates

1866 births
1957 deaths
United States Military Academy alumni
United States Army generals
United States Army generals of World War I
Military personnel from Illinois
People from Lexington, Illinois